The flag of Mohéli is a yellow field with a red star. It is similar to the flag of Vietnam. It was adopted in 2003. It replaced the previous flag, which was adopted when Mohéli became an autonomous island in 2002.

Mohéli separatists formerly flew plain a red flag with a yellow hoist, based on the flag used during the reign of Sultan Jumbe Fatima bint Abderremane in the 19th century.

Historical Flags

Notes

External links

Flag
Comorian culture
Flags of Africa
Flags introduced in 2003